Avoyelles High School, historically known as Moreauville High School, is a public high school  in Moreauville in Avoyelles Parish, Louisiana. 

It educates about 630 pupils in grades 7 to 12 and is part of the Avoyelles Parish School Board. The school building is listed on the National Register of Historic Places.

Building
Moreauville High School was built in 1926. It was designed by architect William T. Nolan in Classical Revival style. The school was renamed Avoyelles High School in 1988, after Avoyelles Parish reorganized its schools to implement court-ordered desegregation.

The school was added to the National Register of Historic Places in 1988 for its significance to architecture in Avoyelles Parish and to education in Moreauville.

Athletics
Avoyelles High athletics competes in the LHSAA.

References

1926 establishments in Louisiana
Educational institutions established in 1926
National Register of Historic Places in Avoyelles Parish, Louisiana
Neoclassical architecture in Louisiana
Public high schools in Louisiana
School buildings completed in 1926
School buildings on the National Register of Historic Places in Louisiana
Schools in Avoyelles Parish, Louisiana